Bhode is a village in Mulshi taluka of Pune District in the state of Maharashtra, India. Talukas surrounding the village are Karjat taluka, Talegaon Dabhade Taluka, Mawal taluka and by Khalapur taluka. Districts closest to the village are Raigad district, Thane district, Mumbai City district and Mumbai Suburban district.  Nearest railway stations around the village are  Vadgaon railway station, Begdewadi railway station, Lonavala railway station, Talegaon railway station and Kamshet railway station

References

External links
  Villages in Mulshi taluka 
  Villages in pune maharashtra
 List of Villages in Mulshi Tehsil

Villages in Mulshi taluka